Western Eyre Marine Park (formerly Western Eyre Commonwealth Marine Reserve) is a marine protected area located in the Great Australian Bight south of South Australia in waters within the Australian Exclusive economic zone.  

It was gazetted in November 2012.  

 
It is part of the group of Australian marine parks known as the South-West Marine Park Network.

It lies east of the Great Australian Bight Marine Park.

See also
Protected areas managed by the Australian government

Notes

External links
Oficial webpage
Webpage for the Western Eyre Commonwealth Marine Reserve on the Protected Planet website
Interactive Map, Commonwealth marine reserves

 Required attribution: © Commonwealth of Australia 2013

IUCN Category II
IUCN Category VI
Australian marine parks
Protected areas established in 2012
2012 establishments in Australia
Great Australian Bight